Michael Francies (born 14 October 1956) is a British solicitor who specializes in equity financing. He is currently the managing partner of the London office of the United States firm, Weil, Gotshal & Manges LLP.
 In 2004 he won the "Partner of the Year" award at The Lawyer awards. He followed this by winning the "Deal Lawyer of the Year" award at the Legal Week awards in 2006.

Early life and education
Francies was born in Israel, but moved to the UK with his family as a young child.  He did most of his schooling and university there.  He earned his law degree at Manchester University (LLB, 1978); and did graduate work in finance at the College of Law, London (LSF, 1979).

Career
After law school and passing the bar, Francies started with Clifford Chance, which became one of the largest global law firms after its merger. It is based at Canary Wharf, but has offices throughout Europe, and in other nations, including the United States.

He moved to Weil Gotshal & Manges in 1998. In 2009 an industry magazine described Francies as "the best UK corporate partner currently practising with a US firm."

Francies was among the "Hot 100 2009" by The Lawyer.

Honours
 World's 10 Best Equity Lawyers, Expert Guides, Managing Partners Forum
 2008, named one of the Times Online's "Law 100", a list of "the most powerful and influential [people] within the law today".

References

English lawyers
English solicitors
1956 births
Living people
English people of Israeli descent